Events during the year 1978 in Northern Ireland.

Incumbents
Secretary of State – Roy Mason

Events
18 January – The European Court of Human Rights finds Britain guilty of inhuman and degrading treatment of republican internees in Northern Ireland, but not guilty of torture.
17 February – The IRA La Mon restaurant bombing kills 12 people.
1 June – David Cook of the Alliance Party becomes the first non-unionist Lord Mayor of Belfast.
21 June – An outbreak of shooting between Provisional IRA members and the British Army leaves one civilian and three IRA men dead.
The Crown Liquor Saloon in Belfast is purchased by the National Trust.
Belfast Zoo reopens following renovation by Belfast City Council.
Belfast City Council begins a major renovation of Belfast Castle.

Arts and literature
May – Release of Rudi's punk rock single "Big Time", the first release for Terri Hooley's Good Vibrations (record label).
September – Release of The Undertones' punk rock single Teenage Kicks, by Good Vibrations.

Sport

Football
Irish League
Winners: Linfield

Irish Cup
Winners: Linfield 3 – 1 Ballymena United

Births
1 January – Phillip Mulryne, footballer.
17 January – Warren Feeney, footballer.
21 January – Paul Leeman, footballer.
12 April – Graham Little, television presenter and journalist.
16 May – James McIntosh, food writer and chef.
23 July – Stuart Elliott, footballer.
26 August – Carolyn Jess-Cooke, writer and academic.
8 September – Colin Nixon, footballer.
23 October – Paul Morgan, footballer.
30 October – Liam Burns, footballer.
18 November – Damien Johnson, footballer.
6 December – Rigsy, radio and television presenter and DJ.

Full date unknown
Andre Shoukri, member of the Ulster Defence Association.
Clare Smyth, chef

Deaths

See also
1978 in Scotland
1978 in Wales

References

 
Northern Ireland